Bingula is a village in Serbia. It is situated in the Šid municipality, in the Srem District, Vojvodina province. The village has a Serb ethnic majority out of the entire population of 906 residents (2002 census) and with significant number of Slovaks in the entire population as well.

Historical population

1961: 1,244
1971: 1,119
1981: 1,025
1991: 915
2002: 906

References
Slobodan Ćurčić, Broj stanovnika Vojvodine, Novi Sad, 1996.

See also
List of places in Serbia
List of cities, towns and villages in Vojvodina

Populated places in Syrmia